Neoregelia capixaba is a bromeliad species in the genus Neoregelia. This species is endemic to Brazil.

References

capixaba
Flora of Brazil